The Telugu Chodas or Telugu Cholas ruled parts of present-day Andhra Pradesh between the sixth and the thirteenth century. The earliest Choda family in the Telugu area was that of Renati Chodas. Other Choda dynasties include Velanti, Pottapi, Konidena, Nannuru, Nellore etc.

Velanati Chodas

Telugu Chodas of Velanadu (Velanati Chola) were one of the Telugu Choda families. Velanadu is located in the modern Guntur district. The chieftains who ruled over Velanadu came to be known as the Velanati Chodas. One of them, Rajendra Choda II had even assumed the title Durjayakulaprakara since Velanati Chodas belong to Durjaya clans. These Velanati chiefs were the subordinate allies of the Later Chodas of the south. They were entrusted with the responsibility of the governance of the Andhra region, which formed a part of the Chola kingdom in the between the tenth and early decades of the thirteenth century. Their capital was Dhanadapura (Dhannada) or Sanaduprolu, the modern Chandolu in the Guntur district initially then later they ruled from Vengi in West Godavari and Pithpuram in East Godavari Districts. Dhannada is also the site of the war between the Cholas and the Later Chalukyas when the Western Chalukya king Satyashraya invaded the Eastern Chalukyas, which was swiftly repulsed by the forces of Rajendra Chola I who helped the Eastern Chalukyas and the Velanadu Chodas with whom the Cholas had marital ties.

The Velanati Chiefs rose to prominence among the vassals of the Chalukyas of Vengi during the early days of Kulothunga Chola I and served as the Later  viceroys faithfully as their trusted lieutenants and generals. Finding his dominion dwindling, due to the ascendancy of the Kalyani Chalukyas in the Vengi country, Kulothunga Chola lent support to his loyal chieftains of Velanadu to bring the situation under control and rule over Vengi as his vassals. Evidence is available to the effect that five chieftains of Velanadu ruled over the country after which it was overrun by the Kakatiyas and became a part of their kingdom.

Velanati Chodas:

 Gonka I (1076–1108 )
 Rajendra Choda I  (1108–1132 )
 Gonka II (1132–1161 )
 Rajendra Choda II (1161–1181 )
 Gonka III (1181–1186 )
 Pruthviswara (1186–1207 )

Renati Chodas

The Telugu Chodas of Renadu (also called as Renati Cholas) ruled over Renadu region, the present day Cuddapah district. In Malepadu plates (seventh century), Renati Chola king Punyakumara stated that they belong to the family of Sangam age Chola king Karikala Chola. They were originally independent, later forced to the suzerainty of the Eastern Chalukyas. They used the Telugu language in their inscriptions of the sixth and eighth centuries. Such inscriptions have found near Muddanur, and at Gandikota, Jammalamadugu and Proddatur. The earliest of this family was Nandivarman (500 AD) who claimed descent from the family of Karikala and the Kasyapa gotra. He had three sons Simhavishnu, Sundarananda and Dhananjaya, all of whom were ruling different territories simultaneously. The family seems to have had its origin in Erigal in the Tunmkur district, situated in the border between Pallava and Kadamba regions. Dhananjaya is described as Erigal-mutturaju and as ruling Renadu. In the first half of the seventh century, we find Punyakumara, a descendant of Nandivarman, ruling over Renadu and Hiranyarashtra. He too bears the title Erikal-mutturaju.

Pottapi Chodas

Telugu Chodas of Pottapi ruled the Cuddapah region after the fall of the Renati Chodas. Their inscriptions from 11th century are found in this area.  It is also believed that they ruled over Chittoor district, since Dhurjati of Kalahasti mentioned that he was from Pottapi region. Now Pottapi is a GramPanchayat of Nandalur mandal of Kadapa district. During the reign of Vikrama Chola, there was a feudatory called Madhurantaka Pottapi Chola who was the son of Siddharasa. The officer claimed descent from Karikala in epigraphs (carana saroruha etc.).

Konidena Chodas

The Konidena Chodas were also a branch of the Renadu Chodas. Their capital was Konidena (also called as Kotyadona) near Narasaraopeta in the Guntur district. They ruled over parts of Palanadu in 11th and 12th centuries. Early kings Kannara Choda and Kama Choda were independent. Tribhuvana Malla Choda, son of Kama Choda, was a chieftain to Gonka II of Velanati Chodas. Nanni Choda, son of Tribhuvana Malla Choda declared independence again, but was soon defeated and forced to be vassals again by Gonka II. After the fall of Velanadu Chodas, they were forced to suzerainty by Ganapatideva of Kakatiyas.

Nannuru Chodas

Nannuru Chodas were another branch of Telugu Chodas in the region of Pakanadu. The famous Telugu poet Kaviraja Sikhamani Nanne Choda belonged to this family. Not much is known of this clan and it is believed to have been a subordinate of Vikramaditya VI of Kalyani Chalukyas.

Nellore Chodas

Nellore Chodas are Telugu Chodas who ruled from the city of Nellore in Andhra Pradesh.

Kunduru Chodas

Kunduru/Kanduru Chodas.

References

Sources
 
 Durga Prasad, History of the Andhras up to 1565 A. D., P. G. PUBLISHERS, GUNTUR (1988)
 K.R.Subramanian, Buddhist Remains in Andhra and The History of Andhra
 Etukuri Balarama murthi,  Andhrula Samkshiptha Charithra
 Paula Richman,  Questioning Ramayana: A South Asian Tradition

Dynasties of India
Empires and kingdoms of India
Lists of Indian monarchs
Chola dynasty
History of Andhra Pradesh